James Walker (April 8, 1944 – July 2, 2007) was an American professional basketball player. A 6'3" (1.91 m) guard, he played nine seasons (1967–1976) in the National Basketball Association (NBA) as a member of the Detroit Pistons, Houston Rockets, and Kansas City-Omaha / Kansas City Kings. Walker was a two-time All-Star who scored 11,655 points in his career. He was also the father of former NBA player Jalen Rose, though he left Rose's mother prior to his birth and took no part in his child's upbringing.  Walker died on July 2, 2007, at the age of 63, from complications related to lung cancer.

Early life
Walker grew up in Boston's Roxbury neighborhood.

Walker attended Laurinburg Institute, a black preparatory school in North Carolina and later earned a scholarship to play at Providence College.

College career
Walker attended Providence College, where he played under head coach Joe Mullaney.
 
At Providence, Walker's game (much as that of Michigan star Cazzie Russell) was compared to that of the premier player of the era, Cincinnati Royals superstar Oscar Robertson. Walker averaged 23 points as a junior, and led the nation with 30 points per game as a senior. His career high of 50 points came in the 1965 Madison Square Garden Holiday Basketball Festival title game, when Providence defeated Bob Cousy's Boston College Eagles team 91-86 to win the tournament. For his efforts, Walker was named MVP of the tournament. Walker was also named MVP of the 1966 Holiday Festival when Providence defeated Saint Joseph's University and Cliff Anderson in the title game. With the two awards, Walker was the first player to be named MVP in the Holiday Festival two years in a row. He was considered to be the first college players to use the between-the-legs dribble as a cross-over move.

Walker led the nation in scoring in his senior year of 1966–67, averaging 30.4 points a game. He caught and passed UCLA's Lew Alcindor in the final weeks of the season. Walker's 2,000-plus career points led Providence for four decades, until his all-time scoring record was broken in 2005 by Ryan Gomes.  Walker was able to accomplish this in only three seasons; at the time, freshmen were not allowed to play varsity basketball. Jimmy Walker ended his college career in the quarterfinals of the 1967 NIT in the last basketball tournament held at the third Madison Square Garden, when he scored 36 points but missed a jump shot at the end of the game as Providence bowed to Marquette 81-80 in overtime. Walker later said that the missed shot was the only thing that went wrong for him in Madison Square Garden.

Overall, Walker averaged 25.2 points, 6.3 rebounds and 5.3 assists in his three seasons (81 games) at Providence.

NBA career
Walker was selected #1 overall pick in the 1967 NBA draft by the Detroit Pistons. He was also drafted #1 overall in the first American Basketball Association Draft by the Indiana Pacers. 1967 was the first year the NBA had abandoned its territorial draft (under the old draft, which granted an extra first round pick to be used on collegians within 100 miles of their professional team, Walker might have been selected by the Celtics and teamed with his mentor Sam Jones). Walker was also the final pick in the 1967 NFL Draft by the New Orleans Saints (the pick now known as Mr. Irrelevant), despite never having played college football; this makes Walker the only athlete drafted first by one pro league (two in his case) and last by another.

Despite playing in two NBA All-Star games, Walker never reached his full potential as a pro, partly due to his weight gain. His game had been predicated on quickness. Nonetheless, he averaged 20.9 ppg in 1969–70, 21.3 in 1971–72, and 19.8 in 1973–74, averaging almost 17 per game over a 9-year career. The numbers are all the more impressive when one considers that Walker teamed with star guards such as Dave Bing in Detroit, and Nate Archibald in Kansas City-Omaha.

Overall in 698 games with the Detroit Pistons (1967–1972), Houston Rockets (1972–1973), and Kansas City Kings (1973–1976), Walker averaged 16.7 points, 2.7 rebounds, and 3.5 assists in his NBA career.

NBA career statistics

Regular season

|-
| style="text-align:left;"| 
| style="text-align:left;"|Detroit
| 81 ||  || 19.6 || .394 ||  || .766 || 1.7 || 2.8 ||  ||  || 8.8
|-
| style="text-align:left;"| 
| style="text-align:left;"|Detroit
| 69 ||  || 23.8 || .466 ||  || .795 || 2.3 || 3.2 ||  ||  || 11.7
|-
| style="text-align:left;"|
| style="text-align:left;"|Detroit
| 81 ||  || 35.4 || .478 ||  || .807 || 3.0 || 3.1 ||  ||  || 20.8
|-
| style="text-align:left;"| 
| style="text-align:left;"|Detroit
| 79 ||  || 35.0 || .436 ||  || .831 || 2.6 || 3.4 ||  ||  || 17.6
|-
| style="text-align:left;"|  
| style="text-align:left;"|Detroit
| 78 ||  || 39.5 || .457 ||  || .827 || 3.0 || 4.0 ||  ||  || 21.3
|-
| style="text-align:left;"|  
| style="text-align:left;"|Houston
| 81 ||  || 38.0 || .465 ||  || .884 || 3.3 || 5.5 ||  ||  || 18.0
|-
| style="text-align:left;" rowspan="2"| 
| style="text-align:left;"|Houston
| 3 ||  || 12.7 || .583 ||  || .000 || .7 || 1.3 || .0 || .0 || 4.7
|-
| style="text-align:left;"|Kansas City-Omaha
| 72 ||  || 40.6 || .468 ||  || .822 || 2.8 || 4.2 || 1.1 || .1 || 19.8
|-
| style="text-align:left;"| 
| style="text-align:left;"|Kansas City-Omaha
| 81 ||  || 38.5 || .475 ||  || .855 || 3.0 || 2.8 || 1.0 || .2 || 16.7
|-
| style="text-align:left;"| 
| style="text-align:left;"|Kansas City
| 73 ||  || 34.1 || .483 ||  || .865 || 2.4 || 2.4 || 1.2 || .2 || 15.7
|- class="sortbottom"
| style="text-align:center;" colspan="2"| Career
| 698 ||  || 33.8 || .461 ||  || .829 || 2.7 || 3.5 || 1.1 || .2 || 16.7
|- class="sortbottom"
| style="text-align:center;" colspan="2"| All-Star
| 2 || 0 || 15.0 || .333 ||  || .500 || 1.5 || .5 ||  ||  || 5.5

Playoffs 

|-
|style="text-align:left;"|1968
|style="text-align:left;”|Detroit
|6||  ||20.2||.463||  ||.824||1.5||1.5||  ||  ||12.7
|-
|style="text-align:left;"|1975
|style="text-align:left;”|Kansas City-Omaha
|6||  ||37.5||.464||  ||.778||1.7||2.8||.8||.2||15.3
|- class="sortbottom"
| style="text-align:center;" colspan="2"| Career
| 12 ||  || 28.8 || .464 ||  || .800 || 1.6 || 2.2 || .8 || .2 || 14.0

College statistics

|-
| style="text-align:left;"| 1964–65
| style="text-align:left;"| Providence
| 26 ||  || 37.5 || .475 ||  || .769 || 6.1 || 5.2 ||  ||  || 20.5
|-
| style="text-align:left;"| 1965–66
| style="text-align:left;"| Providence
| 27 ||  || 39.0 || .508 ||  || .772 || 6.7 || 5.5 ||  ||  || 24.5
|-
| style="text-align:left;"| 1966-67
| style="text-align:left;"| Providence
| 28 ||  || 39.7 || .490 ||  || .801 || 6.0 || 5.1 ||  ||  || 30.4
|- class=sortbottom
| style="text-align:center;" colspan=2| Career

| 81 ||  || 38.8 || .492 ||  || .783 || 6.3 || 5.3 ||  ||  || 25.2
|-

Personal life
"I was hurt, saddened, and selfishly disappointed that we never got a chance to meet," said Jalen Rose, at his father's funeral in 2007. "You want to know something? We were supposed to meet this month, we were supposed to meet this month." The two had spoken on the phone several times before Walker's death.

Honors
The basketball award at Providence is called the Jimmy Walker Most Valuable Player Award.

In 2008, Providence honored Walker's number with The Friar Legends Forever Tradition.

Jalen Rose hosted the Providence Late Night Event in 2014.

References

External links
New York Times
Career Stats
N.Y. Times Obituary for Jimmy Walker

1944 births
2007 deaths
African-American basketball players
All-American college men's basketball players
Basketball players from Virginia
Deaths from lung cancer in Missouri
Detroit Pistons draft picks
Detroit Pistons players
Houston Rockets players
Kansas City Kings players
National Basketball Association All-Stars
People from Amherst, Virginia
Providence Friars men's basketball players
Shooting guards
Basketball players from Boston
Basketball players from Kansas City, Missouri
American men's basketball players
20th-century African-American sportspeople
21st-century African-American people